Walter Albert Ferdinand Brunn (2 September 1876, in Göttingen – 21 December 1952, in Leipzig) was a German surgeon and historian of medicine.

He studied medicine at the universities of Göttingen and Rostock, where he was a student of Carl Garré. From 1900 to 1905 he served as a surgical assistant in the university clinics at Berlin and Marburg, and afterwards opened a private surgical practice in Rostock. As a hospital physician during World War I, he lost an arm as the result of a septic infection, thus ending his career as a surgeon.

In 1919 he obtained his habilitation with a thesis on the medieval surgeon Guy de Chauliac, and in 1924 became an associate professor at the University of Rostock. From 1934 to 1950 he was a professor of the history of medicine at the University of Leipzig.

From 1934 to 1950 he was director of the Karl Sudhoff-Institut für Geschichte der Medizin und der Naturwissenschaften (Karl Sudhoff Institute for the History of Medicine and Natural Sciences) at Leipzig. From 1947 to 1951 he was vice-president of the Deutsche Akademie der Naturforscher Leopoldina.

Selected works 
 Von den Gilden der Barbiere und Chirurgen in den Hansestädten, 1921 – On the guilds of barbers and surgeons in the Hanseatic towns.
 Kurze Geschichte der Chirurgie, 1928 – Brief history of surgery.
 Paracelsus und seine Schwindsuchtlehre, 1941 – Paracelsus and tuberculosis teaching.
 Medizinische Zeitschriften im neunzehnten Jahrhundert (posthumous, 1963) – Medical journals in the nineteenth century.

References 

1876 births
1952 deaths
Physicians from Göttingen
Academic staff of the University of Rostock
Academic staff of Leipzig University
German surgeons
German medical historians